Big Butte may refer to:

Big Butte Creek, tributary of the Rogue River in Oregon, United States
Big Butte Springs,  natural springs in Jackson County, Oregon, United States
A fictitious town in Penn Zero: Part-Time Hero
Big Butte (California), a mountain
Big Butte (Nevada), a mountain
Big Butte (Washington), a mountain

See also
Big Butt Mountain (disambiguation), multiple summits in North Carolina, United States
Big Southern Butte, lava domes in Idaho, United States